Kesari Nandan is an Indian social drama television series that aired on Colors TV from 1 January to 26 July 2019. It starred Chahat Tewani, Manav Gohil, and Aastha Chaudhary. This serial also dubbed in Sinhala language as Diriya Doni on Hiru TV.

Plot
Kesari Nandan wants to wrestle to fulfill her father Hanumant's dream. But he believes girls can't wrestle. Kesari fakes being a boy and starts learning wrestling from him. Hanumant is ashamed when people know her truth. Annoyed, he fixes Kesari's marriage to Jawahar, her friend Unnati's brother, who demands dowry. Kesari breaks off the marriage and works hard later when her brother Jagat is paralyzed, and as Hanumant breaks down thinking his dream will never fulfill. In the end, Kesari wins the title of India Kesari.

Cast
 Chahat Tewani as Kesari Nandan Singh – A female wrestler; Hanumant and Madhvi's daughter; Jagat's sister
 Manav Gohil as Hanumant Singh – wrester; Bhakti's step-son; Zorawar's half-brother; Madhvi's husband; Jagat and Kesari's father
 Aastha Chaudhary as Madhavi Singh – Hanumant's wife; Jagat and Kesari's mother
 Shoaib Ali as Jagat Singh – Hanumant and Madhvi's son; Kesari's brother
 Aalok Shaw as Child Jagat Singh
 Dakssh Ajit Singh as Bhairon Singh – Hanumant's friend; Kesari's coach
 Nivedita Joshi-Saraf as Bhakti Singh – Zorawar's mother; Hanumant's step-mother; Jagat and Kesari's step-grandmother
 Ankit Arora as Zorawar Singh – Bhakti's son; Hanumant's half-brother; Bijli's husband
 Reshma Shinde as Bijli Singh – Zorawar's wife
 Deshna Duggad as Kalki Rana
 Ayaz Khan as Suyash Rana
 Shivlekh Singh as Pappu – Kesari's friend
 Tasheen Shah as Unnati Dunavati – Anand and Namita's daughter; Jawahar's sister; Kesari's friend
 Mayank Nishchal as Jawahar Dunavati – Anand and Namita's son; Unnati's brother; Kesari's proposed groom
 Darpan Srivastava as Anand Dunavati – Hanumant's friend; Namita's husband; Jawahar and Unnati's father
 Anjali Rana as Namita Dunavati – Anand's wife; Jawahar and Unnati's mother
 Shakku Rana as Police Inspector Aarav Upresh Rao
 Rajesh Chahar as Chirag Babbar – Jawahar's friend
 Nikhhil R Khera as Himmat Singh
 Firoz Ali as Pappu's father

References 

2019 Indian television series debuts
Indian drama television series
Colors TV original programming
Hindi-language television shows
Indian sports television series